Hypersonic weapons are weapons capable of travelling at hypersonic speed, defined as between 5 and 25 times the speed of sound or about .

Below such speeds, weapons would be characterized as subsonic or supersonic, while above such speeds, the molecules of the atmosphere disassociate into a plasma which makes control and communication difficult.  Directed-energy weapons such as lasers may operate at higher speeds but are considered a different class of weaponry.

There are multiple types of hypersonic weapon:

 hypersonic glide vehicle (HGV): missiles which maneuver and glide through the atmosphere at high speeds after an initial ballistic launch phase
 hypersonic cruise missiles: cruise missiles which use air-breathing engines such as scramjets to reach high speeds 
 hypersonic aircraft using air-breathing engines such as scramjets to reach high speeds 
 guns which fire guided projectiles.  These may be developments of traditional artillery or novel technologies such as railguns. 
 ballistic missiles traveling at high speeds during its atmospheric reentry

History

The Silbervogel was the first design for a hypersonic weapon, made by German scientists in the 1930s.

In the 2022 Russian invasion of Ukraine, Russia was seen to have fielded operational weapons and used them for combat. The Kremlin presents new hypersonic weapons as capable of overcoming "any" foreign missile-defense systems, and the idea dovetails nicely with the "pre-nuclear deterrence" concept contained in its 2014 iteration of the official Russian Military Doctrine.

By country
See also Hypersonic flight#Hypersonic weapons, National Defense Space Architecture

Plans, programs and projects for such weaponry include:

Multinational
 Future Cruise/Anti-Ship Weapon, between France and United Kingdom
 Project P282, between Pakistan and China
 SCIFiRE, between the US and Australia.

China
The People's Liberation Army of the People's Republic of China views hypersonic missiles as a significant component of military strategy in the region and as a possible strategic deterrent. In a July 2018 paper written for the Carnegie Endowment, senior fellow and Chinese-language researcher Tong Zhao details the principal motivating factors for Beijing's pursuit of hypersonic weapon capabilities: preventing a military technology gap with the nation's adversaries (historically similar to the 'Two Bombs, One Satellite' project) and, for other Chinese defense planners, addressing specific security threats from advanced U.S. military technologies such as the Conventional Prompt Global Strike (CPGS) program which, by promising to enable the United States to strike anywhere in the world with conventional weapons in under an hour, raises grave fears among Chinese strategists that Washington would be capable of a disabling, conventional first strike against Chinese nuclear forces, potentially evading a nuclear conflict. With such attention on the development of hypersonic weapons, The number of Chinese-language publications on the topics of hypersonic weapons climbed significantly since the late 1990s, often following upticks in U.S. announcements and investment into the CPGS program such as the 2003 instruction by the George W. Bush's administration to Strategic Command (USSTRATCOM) to prepare a plan for "global prompt strike" operations. Harbin Institute of Technology, National University of Defense Technology (NUDT), and the Chinese Academy of Sciences have been identified as the most prominent research-producing institutions on hypersonic weapons technologies including fluid dynamics, boundary layer management, propulsion technology, thermal shock resistance, and hypersonic target detection.

Chinese hypersonic weapons systems include:
 DF-ZF mounted on the DF-17
 YJ-21

Brazil
 14-X

India
 BrahMos-II
 HGV-202F
 Hypersonic Technology Demonstrator Vehicle
 Shaurya (missile)

Russia
 Avangard
 Kh-47M2 Kinzhal
 3M22 Zircon

France
 V-MAX (Véhicule Manœuvrant Expérimental) HGV
 ASN4G ((Air-Sol Nucléaire de 4e Génération) nuclear-tipped air-launched cruise missile
 Future Cruise/Anti-Ship Weapon cruise missile

Germany
 SHEFEX II HGV (DLR research)

Japan
 Hyper Velocity Gliding Projectile
 Hypersonic Cruise Missile (HCM)

South Korea
 Hycore cruise missile
 Hyunmoo IV-4
 Hyunmoo V

United States
 AGM-183 ARRW – an Air-Launched Rapid Response Weapon or "Arrow" (Air Force)
 Boeing X-51 Waverider
 Cannon-Caliber Electromagnetic Gun launcher
 DARPA Falcon Project (Hypersonic Weapon System (HWS))
 Hypersonic Attack Cruise Missile (Air Force)
 Long-Range Hypersonic Weapon (Army) and Conventional Prompt Strike (Navy) boost-glide system, both will use the same Common-Hypersonic Glide Body HGV 
 OpFires (DARPA)
 Hypersonic Air-Launched Offensive Anti-Surface Warfare, or HALO OASuW anti-ship cruise missile (Navy)
 Prompt Global Strike (Advanced Hypersonic Weapon)

United Kingdom
Future Cruise/Anti-Ship Weapon

Taiwan
 Ching Tian Hypersonic Cruise Missile

Hypersonic missile defense

See also 
 Hypersonic cruise missile 
 Hypersonic flight
 Hypersonic glide vehicle
 Scramjet programs

References

Hypersonic aircraft
Projectile weapons
Rockets and missiles